CIVC Partners, previously known as Continental Illinois Venture Corporation, is a Chicago-based private equity firm that presently has over $1.8 billion of equity capital under management.  The firm's predecessor was established in 1970 as a subsidiary of Continental Illinois National Bank and Trust Company.  CIVC Partners provides growth and buyout capital to middle-market companies engaged in business services, utility and infrastructure services, facility services, transportation & logistics, outsourced services, environmental services, IT services, software & tech-enabled services, insurance services, compliance and risk management, digital marketing services and financial technology.
When Continental Illinois was acquired in 1994 by Bank of America, the CIVC team formed a semi-independent private equity firm, CIVC Partners, with backing from Bank of America. Today, CIVC is an independent middle-market private equity firm with a diverse group of L.P. investors, and recently raised its sixth fund.

CIVC's major past and present investments include: Crest Insurance Group, a leading insurance brokerage; Magna Legal Services, a legal support services firm; KPA, an EHS compliance management software company; The Brickman Group, a commercial landscaping company; Thermo Fluids, an environmental services company; Stoneridge Insurance Brokers, an insurance brokerage and managing general agent; EN Engineering, a utility/power/energy focused engineering company; PowerTeam Services, a provider of infrastructure services to the gas and electric utility industry; Ground Penetrating Radar Systems (GPRS), a nationwide provider of private utility locating and concrete scanning services; LA Fitness, a leading operating of full service fitness clubs throughout the US; and  Wintrust Financial Corporation, a regional bank holding company.

References

External links
www.civc.com (company website)

Financial services companies established in 1970
Private equity firms of the United States
Investment banking private equity groups
Companies based in Chicago